Tinotus is a genus of beetles belonging to the family Staphylinidae.

The species of this genus are found in America.

 Tinotus acerbus
 Tinotus caviceps
 Tinotus imbricatus

References

Staphylinidae
Staphylinidae genera